Powdered sugar, also called confectioners' sugar, or icing sugar, is a finely ground sugar produced by milling granulated sugar into a powdered state. It usually contains between 2% and 5% of an anti-caking agent – such as corn starch, potato starch or tricalcium phosphate – to  absorb moisture, prevent clumping, and improve flow. Although most often produced in a factory, a proxy for powdered sugar can be made by processing ordinary granulated sugar in a coffee grinder, or by crushing it by hand in a mortar and pestle.

Use
Powdered sugar is used in industrial food production when a quick-dissolving sugar is required. Home cooks use it principally to make icing or frosting and other cake decorations. It is often dusted onto baked goods to add a subtle sweetness and delicate decoration.

Powdered sugar is available in varying degrees of fineness, most commonly XXX, XXXX, and 10X: the greater the number of Xs, the finer the particles. Finer particles absorb more moisture, which results in caking. Because of anticaking agents, it cannot always be used as a substitute for granulated sugar.  Canadian regulations limit powdered sugar to 5% starch or an anticaking agent.

Other varieties

Caster sugar
Caster sugar (also referred to as superfine, bar, or baker's sugar) has a larger particle size than powdered sugar, approximately half that of granulated sugar, and has no added starch. It is commonly used in baking and cold mixed drinks because it dissolves faster than granulated white sugar. Caster sugar can be easily prepared at home by grinding white sugar in a food processor to make it finer. The most common food caster sugar is used in is meringue.

Snow powder

Snow powder (or snow sugar) is a non-melting form of icing sugar used for visual appeal on cakes or pastries that require refrigeration. It usually contains glucose, starch, and anti-binding agents (such as titanium dioxide, which gives it a vibrant white color), and retains its structure and look even when dusted onto baked goods that are slightly wet like fruit bars and tarts. It will not melt even if it is sprinkled on whipped cream or ice cream. It is mostly used for decorative purposes.

Snow sugar is less sweet than regular powdered sugar because glucose is around 20% less sweet than table sugar, which also contains fructose. Fructose tastes more than twice as sweet as glucose.

Citations

General sources

External links

Sugars
Powders